Erdősmecske (until 1948: Rácmecske; ;  / Srpska Mečka, Рацмечка / Racmečka) is a village in Baranya county, Hungary. Majority residents are Magyars, with minority of Serbs. Until the end of World War II, the Inhabitants was Danube Swabians. Mostly of the former German Settlers was expelled to Germany and Austria in 1945–1948, about the Potsdam Agreement.

References

External links 
 Local statistics 

Populated places in Baranya County
Serb communities in Hungary